Antonio Cárdenas (born March 31, 1963) is an American politician who has served as the United States representative for California's 29th congressional district since January 2013.

A member of the Democratic Party, Cárdenas was previously a member of the Los Angeles City Council, representing the Sixth Council District, which covers parts of the northeast San Fernando Valley, including Arleta, Pacoima, Sun Valley, North Hollywood, Panorama City, Van Nuys, and Lake Balboa.

Cárdenas was elected to the California State Assembly for three consecutive terms and chaired the budget committee. He was elected to the Los Angeles City Council in 2003 and reelected in 2007 and 2011. Cárdenas was elected to Congress in 2012 and has been reelected every two years since.

Early life and education
Cárdenas was born on March 31, 1963, in Pacoima, Los Angeles. He is one of 11 children of Andrés Cárdenas and María Quezada, who immigrated to the United States shortly after marrying in Jalisco, Mexico, in 1946. Andrés Cárdenas was a farm worker near Stockton, California, before the family relocated to Pacoima in 1954.

Cárdenas graduated from San Fernando High School in the northeast San Fernando Valley. In 1986, he earned a Bachelor of Arts degree in electrical engineering from the University of California, Santa Barbara.

California State Assembly

Elections
In 1996, Cárdenas ran for California's 39th State Assembly district after Democratic incumbent Richard Katz decided not to run for reelection. He defeated Republican Ollie McCaulley 72%-28%. In 1998, he was reelected with 87% of the vote. In 2000, he was reelected to a third term with 78% of the vote.

Tenure
Cárdenas's state reforms brought 78,000 new classroom seats and 15 playgrounds throughout Los Angeles. He also secured more than $650 million for new school construction. He authored legislation that reformed California's gang prevention and intervention programs and teamed up with fellow Democrat Adam Schiff to create the Schiff-Cárdenas Juvenile Justice Crime Prevention Act.

Committee assignments
Energy and Commerce

Los Angeles City Council

Elections

In 2002, Cárdenas ran for the Los Angeles City Council's 2nd district. Wendy Greuel defeated him 50.4%-49.6%, a difference of 225 votes. In 2003, he ran for the City Council's 6th district. He defeated Jose Roy Garcia 69%-31%. In 2007, he was reelected with 66% of the vote. In 2011, he was reelected to a third term with 58% of the vote.

Tenure
Cárdenas is an animal rights activist. He authored legislation that created Los Angeles's first Animal Cruelty Task Force, which arrests animal abusers. He supported the city's mandatory spay/neuter ordinance to reduce the number of stray and homeless animals.

Cárdenas strongly supported green energy. He proposed the Renewable Energy Portfolio Standard that established goals for the city's Department of Water and Power to obtain at least 20% of its energy from wind and solar. He also proposed a plan that would convert all of the city's taxis to be fuel-efficient by 2015.

As chair of the City's Ad Hoc Committee on Gang Violence and Youth Development, Cárdenas identified millions of dollars overlooked by the City to help keep kids off the streets, and reduced crime while reducing expenditures on crime abatement programs. As vice chair of the City's Public Safety Committee, he spearheaded the most comprehensive gang intervention model in the country. The Community-Based Gang Intervention Model standardized and defined the methods used by gang intervention workers to help stop violence in some of Los Angeles's most dangerous neighborhoods.

In 2012, Cárdenas passed amendments to the City's daytime curfew ordinance. The new policy eliminated fines of up to $500 that students were facing. It also reduced court visits for parents and students and gave students the opportunity to do community service to eliminate citations.

Committee assignments
Business Tax Reform (chair)
Energy and Natural Resources (chair)
Gang Violence and Youth Development (chair)
Budget and Finance
Housing, Community and Economic Development

U.S. House of Representatives

Committee assignments
Committee on Energy and Commerce
Subcommittee on Communications and Technology
Subcommittee on Consumer Protection and Commerce (vice chair)
Subcommittee on Health

Caucus memberships
New Democrat Coalition
American Sikh Congressional Caucus
House Baltic Caucus
Congressional Arts Caucus
Congressional Hispanic Caucus

Elections
In 2012, Cárdenas ran for the newly redrawn California's 29th congressional district after redistricting. In the June open primary, he ranked first with 64% of the vote. Independent David Hernandez, president of the San Fernando Chamber of Commerce, ranked second with 22% of the vote, qualifying for the November election. Richard Valdez ranked third with 14% of the vote. In the November general election, Cárdenas defeated Hernandez, 74%-26%.

Tenure
As of October 2021, Cárdenas had voted in line with Joe Biden's stated position 100% of the time.

Political positions

Abortion
Cárdenas opposed the overturning of Roe v. Wade, calling it an "all out assault on autonomy".

Big Tech
In 2022, Cárdenas was one of 16 Democrats to vote against the Merger Filing Fee Modernization Act of 2022, an antitrust package that would crack down on corporations for anti-competitive behavior.

Personal life
Chicano literature author Luis J. Rodriguez is Cárdenas's brother-in-law.

On May 3, 2018, Cárdenas identified himself as the subject of a lawsuit filed in Los Angeles County alleging sexual abuse of a minor in 2007. The lawsuit alleged that a (then unnamed) local politician drugged a 16-year-old girl at the Hillcrest Country Club in Los Angeles and then sexually molested her while driving her to the emergency room after she passed out, though there has been no evidence to link him to such accusations. Cárdenas issued a statement in response to the charges, calling them "100%, categorically untrue".

On July 3, 2019, Angela Chavez, the woman who made the accusations against Cárdenas, dropped the lawsuit. It was also noted that her father, Gus Villela, approached Richard Alarcon, who ran against Cárdenas in 2016, offering to spread negative information about Cárdenas in exchange for a job with Alarcon's congressional campaign. Alarcon said he declined to hire Villela and reported the meeting to the FBI. The case was settled as a resolution, not a settlement, with prejudice, meaning that the lawsuit cannot be refiled, vindicating Cárdenas.

See also
 List of Hispanic and Latino Americans in the United States Congress

References

External links

 Congressman Tony Cárdenas official U.S. House website
 Tony Cardenas for Congress campaign website
 
 

|-

 
|-

|-

|-

1963 births
21st-century American politicians
American politicians of Mexican descent
Child sexual abuse in the United States
Hispanic and Latino American members of the United States Congress
Hispanic and Latino American state legislators in California
Living people
Los Angeles City Council members
Democratic Party members of the United States House of Representatives from California
Politicians from Los Angeles
San Fernando High School alumni
University of California, Santa Barbara alumni